Felícia Fuster i Viladecans (7 January 1921 – 3 March 2012) was a Spanish painter, poet and translator. Born in Barcelona, she moved to Paris in 1951. She was finalist for the Premi Carles Riba in 1984 and Premi Màrius Torres in 1997, and she won the Premi Vicent Andrés Estellés in 1987.

Works

Poetry 
 Trilogia:
  Una cançó per a ningú i Trenta diàlegs inútils, Barcelona: Proa, 1984
 Aquelles cordes del vent, Barcelona: Proa, 1987
 I encara. València: Eliseu Climent|Eliseu Climent, Editor / Edicions 3i4, 1987
 Écume fêlée
 Au bout des os au bout des mots, 1989.
 Passarel•les/Mosaïques. Barcelona: Cafè Central, 1992
 Versió original. València: Germania, 1996
Sorra de Temps Absent. Lleida: Pagès Editors, 1998
 Postals no escrites. Barcelona: Proa, 2001

Prose 
  "A dins a fora", Barceldones. Barcelona: Edicions de l'Eixample, 1989

Essay 
 "La poesia japonesa moderna", Revista de Catalunya, 1988, pp. 131–150

Translations 
From French language
 Marguerite Yourcenar: Obra negra [L'Œuvre au noir] Barcelona: Proa, 1984
From Japanese language
 Poesia japonesa contemporània, with Naoyuki Sawada. Barcelona: Proa, 1988
To Japanese :
 Poesia catalana contemporània, with Naoyuki Sawada. Tokyo: Shichosha, 1988

Plastic works 
 Nora Ancarola i Lola Donaire i Abancó (curadores): Felícia Fuster, obra plàstica. Fundació Felícia Fuster, 2008

References

External links 
  Fundació Felícia Fuster i Viladecans
  "Entrevista. Felícia Fuster, poeta i pintora"

1921 births
2012 deaths
Writers from Catalonia
Painters from Catalonia
Translators from Catalonia
Translators to Catalan
Translators from Catalan
Translators to Japanese
Translators from Japanese
Translators to Spanish
French–Catalan translators
French–Spanish translators
Spanish expatriates in France
Spanish writers in French
Spanish women poets
Spanish women essayists
20th-century Spanish poets
20th-century Spanish women writers
20th-century translators
20th-century essayists